The Oleksandr Dovzhenko State Prize of Ukraine is a state award  of Ukraine established to honor an outstanding contribution to the development of Ukrainian cinema. The award was established on the occasion of the 100th anniversary of the birth of the outstanding figure of Ukrainian culture Oleksandr Dovzhenko.

Laureates 
Bohdan Beniuk
Oleg Borisov
Boryslav Brondukov
Volodymyr Huba
Mykhailo Illienko
Yuri Ilyenko
Sergei Loznitsa
Kira Muratova
Serhiy Mykhalchuk
Leonid Osyka
Ruslana Pysanka
Ada Rogovtseva
Oles Sanin
Myroslav Slaboshpytskyi
Konstantin Stepankov
Bohdan Stupka
Valentyn Vasyanovych
Natalya Vorozhbyt
Alla Zahaikevych

See also 
List of Ukrainian State Prizes

References 

Ukrainian film awards
Awards established in 1994
State Prizes of Ukraine